Cain Robb (born ) is an English professional rugby league footballer who plays as a  for Castleford Tigers in the Betfred Super League.

Robb made his Super League debut for Castleford on 11 July 2021 against the Salford Red Devils, and was voted the Fans' Man of the Match for his performance. In his second senior appearance weeks later, he was once again named Fans' Man of the Match.

References

External links
Castleford Tigers profile

2003 births
Living people
Castleford Tigers players
English rugby league players
Rugby league hookers
Rugby league players from Leeds
Whitehaven R.L.F.C. players